Charles F. Abernathy (born 1946) is an American legal scholar who works as a professor at the Georgetown University Law Center. He is a graduate of Harvard University and of Harvard Law School.

Books 
Abernathy, Charles F. Civil Rights: Cases and Materials. St. Paul, Minn. : West Pub. Co., 2012 (fifth edition)  
Shulman, Stephen N., and Charles F. Abernathy.  The law of equal employment opportunity. Boston: Warren, Gorham & Lamont. 1990 
Abernathy, Charles F. Law in the United States: Cases and Materials. Washington, D.C: International Law Institute, 1995.

References

Harvard Law School alumni
Living people
1946 births
Georgetown University Law Center faculty
American legal scholars
Harvard College alumni